General elections were held in Japan on 10 May 1924. No party won a majority of seats, resulting in Kenseikai, Rikken Seiyūkai and the Kakushin Club forming the country's first coalition government led by Katō Takaaki.

Electoral system
The 464 members of the House of Representatives were elected in 295 single-member constituencies, 68 two-member constituencies and 11 three-member constituencies. Voting was restricted to men aged over 25 who paid at least 3 yen a year in direct taxation.

Campaign
A total of 972 candidates contested the elections, of which 265 were from Kenseikai, 242 from Seiyūhontō, 218 from Rikken Seiyūkai, 53 from the Kakushin Club and 194 from minor parties or running as independents.

Results

References

General elections in Japan
Japan
1924 elections in Japan
May 1924 events
Election and referendum articles with incomplete results